Simone Scherer (born ) was a Swiss individual trampolinist, representing her nation at international competitions.

She competed at world championships, including at the 2013 Trampoline World Championships. She participated at the 2010 Summer Youth Olympics.

References

External links

1994 births
Living people
Swiss female trampolinists
Place of birth missing (living people)
Gymnasts at the 2010 Summer Youth Olympics